340 Fremont Street is a  residential skyscraper in the Rincon Hill neighborhood of San Francisco, California.  The tower has 348 residential units on 40 floors.

History
As part of the Rincon Hill Plan adopted in August 2005, the parcels at 340 Fremont and 350 Fremont were up-zoned for a single  residential tower.  Developed by Archstone Smith and Jackson Pacific Ventures, and initially designed by Heller Manus Architects, the development was approved for 332 residential units with 332 underground parking spaces by the San Francisco Planning Commission on June 15, 2006.

Due to the United States housing market correction and the ensuing worldwide financial crisis, construction was delayed. During 2008 to 2013, a period of market recovery, the project received five consecutive 12-month extensions of its entitlements. In 2012, the project was redesigned by Handel Architects, and the number of units was increased to 348, while the number of parking spaces was reduced to 269.

In 2013, the project entitlements were acquired by Equity Residential, with plans to break ground by the end of 2013.  In late 2013, demolition and construction permits were issued but a neighboring homeowner association appealed the permits.  In February 2014, the appeal was denied, clearing the way for construction to begin. Demolition of existing structures on the site began in March 2014. Ceremonial groundbreaking took place on April 24, 2014.  The building was topped-out on October 22, 2015, and residents began moving in mid-2016.

Design

The project features 348 residential units, consisting of 91 studios, 119 one-bedrooms, and 138 two-bedrooms.  269 parking spaces are located on three underground levels, primarily in stackers. The building has an  podium, topped with an outdoor terrace.

Previous structures on the site that were razed included a 3-story building at 340 Fremont Street, constructed in 1962, once occupied by the National Maritime Engineers Benefit Association, and 350 Fremont Street, constructed in 1952, which was previously occupied by the Seafarer's Union. To partially mitigate the loss of the "maritime labor historic context", the project will include a publicly accessible interpretive display in a midblock passage off Fremont Street.

Gallery

See also

List of tallest buildings in San Francisco

References

Residential condominiums in San Francisco
Residential buildings in San Francisco
Residential skyscrapers in San Francisco
Skyscrapers in San Francisco
South of Market, San Francisco